Cheyenne Mountain is a triple-peaked mountain in El Paso County, Colorado, southwest of downtown Colorado Springs. The mountain serves as a host for military, communications, recreational, and residential functions. The underground operations center for the North American Aerospace Defense Command (NORAD) was built during the Cold War to monitor North American airspace for missile launches and Soviet military aircraft. Built deep within granite, it was designed to withstand the impact and fallout from a nuclear bomb. Its function broadened with the end of the Cold War, and then many of its functions were transferred to Peterson Air Force Base in 2006.

Homesteading on the mountain began in 1867 and the mountain was the site of resorts and retreats beginning in the 1880s. Spencer Penrose, who built The Broadmoor in 1918, bought many of the properties on the mountain and built the Cheyenne Mountain Zoo, Cheyenne Mountain Highway, Will Rogers Shrine of the Sun, a lodge on one of the mountain peaks, and a retreat at Emerald Valley. The site of the lodge has become a wilderness Cloud Camp and Emerald Valley is now the site of The Broadmoor's Ranch at Emerald Valley. Land on Cheyenne Mountain that had once been owned by The Broadmoor is now the site of luxury homes. A community, Overlook Colony, that began in 1911 still resides on the mountain.

The two parks on and at the base of Cheyenne Mountain are Cheyenne Mountain State Park and North Cheyenne Cañon Park. A noticeable feature on the top of one of Cheyenne Mountain's peaks is an antenna farm with transmitters for cellular phone, radio, television, and law enforcement purposes.

Geography
Cheyenne Mountain has three peaks. It was formerly called Mount Albrecht. The antenna farm sits on the middle peak. The northern peak, The Horns, may look to some like the head of a dragon or horns.

The mountain's boundaries are Rock Creek, which flows from Mount Big Chief through Cheyenne Mountain to the town of Fountain, to the south and Cheyenne Cañon to the north. The western side of Cheyenne Mountain is in Pike National Forest, within the Pikes Peak Ranger District. Colorado Springs' skyline features Cheyenne Mountain and Pikes Peak. Other mountain peaks are Mount Arthur, Mount Baldy, Mount Rosa, Cameron's Cone, and Mount Garfield.

History

Early history
Cheyenne Mountain was named for the Cheyenne people. Native Americans found that Cheyenne Mountain was a good source of wood for teepee poles. It was visited by Cheyenne and Arapaho people, who may have sought spiritual inspiration from the mountain's waterfalls. Cheyenne Mountain was used by Ute Native Americans to cross from the plains and benefit from the "steep slopes and hidden valleys" to safely travel from enemy tribes that had their horses stolen by the Utes.

Late 19th century
William Dixon, a rancher, claimed a homestead in the Cheyenne Mountain foothills in 1867. He built a tavern along a trail up Cheyenne Mountain and turned the trail into a toll road, now called Old Stage Road, to Cripple Creek. The road begins as a paved road and is then a dirt road through Pike National Forest. His homestead ultimately became part of The Broadmoor resort.

The Cheyenne Mining District was located on Cheyenne Mountain. The Little Suzie gold mine was built by a group of prospectors in the 1870s. Silver and minerals were mined on Cheyenne Mountain in 1883. Towns or resorts built on Cheyenne Mountain included the original Bruin Inn (1884), Watsonville (town named in 1884) and Wade City, also called Wade's Resort, (1885). The first mining claims granted for El Paso County were for the Manganese and Rio Grande lodes on Cheyenne Mountain by January 31, 1885.

Early 20th century
The Colorado Springs and Cripple Creek District Railway (Short Line) traversed Cheyenne Mountain
during the trip between Cripple Creek and Colorado Springs by 1905. It transported coal, mined ore, and passengers. Also at that time, a carriage road went to Seven Lakes and the summit of Pikes Peak from Cheyenne Mountain.

Grace Lutheran Church built a retreat in Emerald Valley in 1904. It is now The Broadmoor's Ranch at Emerald Valley. In 1905, Dr. August McKay homesteaded on 120 acres on the east slope of Cheyenne Mountain. He developed a series of trails and rest houses that led to The Sunshine Inn that he built as a health resort above Old Stage Road. The property was purchased by Spencer Penrose, who had the inn torn down.

The Overlook Colony was started in 1911 by a group of Colorado College professors. It first started as a summer retreat for the educators, and grew to include musicians, doctors, artists, generals, oilmen, and an ambassador to India. The Cheyenne Mountain Zoo was built just below and the Will Rogers Shrine built just above this community. Residents manage the Overlook Colony Mutual Water Company that governs water conservation, maintenance, and testing of the water supply from deep within the former Little Susie gold mine.

Bert Swisher and Thomas Dixon homesteaded on Cheyenne Mountain in 1917. Dixon resided with his family in a cabin near the top of the mountain in the middle of three valleys. Swisher's cabin was near the present site of the antenna farm at the top of the mountain, which was accessed by Old Stage Road.

Spencer Penrose and The Broadmoor
Cheyenne Mountain became a successful recreational and resort area when Spencer Penrose developed The Broadmoor resort in 1918. The Cheyenne Mountain Cog Railroad provided narrow gauge cog railway service to South Cheyenne Cañon from the Broadmoor Casino beginning in 1918. It later offered service from The Broadmoor to the Cheyenne Mountain Zoo. Service ended in 1974.

In the 1920s, Penrose began to develop on Cheyenne Mountain property on the northern peak that he bought in 1915. He built the Cheyenne Mountain Highway in 1925. In 1926, the Cheyenne Mountain Lodge opened at the top of Cheyenne Mountain. It had a restaurant, a suite for Penrose on the third floor, four guest rooms, and living quarters for servants. Visitors could make the trip up the Cheyenne Mountain Highway on the backs of elephants. The lodge closed in 1961. It was razed in 1976 following years of destruction by vandals. It is now the site of The Broadmoor's Cloud Camp lodge and cabins.

The Cheyenne Mountain Highway was built for transport to the zoo, shrine, and top of the mountain. The Broadmoor built a ski area on Cheyenne Mountain in 1959. In 1986, the resort closed Ski Broadmoor, but the city of Colorado Springs and Ski Vail stepped in to keep it open. It closed in 1991. The land was sold to the Broadmoor Resort Community Association. Land that had once been owned by The Broadmoor on the mountain was sold and is now the site of luxury homes.

NORAD operations center

In the 1950s, during the Cold War, the interior of the mountain became a site for the operations center for the North American Aerospace Defense Command (NORAD). The center, deep within Cheyenne Mountain, was completed in 1966 after spending $142 million and using 500 tons of explosives. The result was an underground city operated by the Air Force. Popular Science wrote in 1965, before the dedication of the facility, that Cheyenne Mountain would be the only mountain to have buildings constructed within its interior. It was built to withstand being bombed: eleven multiple-story buildings stand on coil springs to absorb the shock of a blast, and care was taken to make sure that up to 800 people could survive a nuclear exchange. The buildings are encased in steel, surrounded by granite, and the facility is behind blast-proof doors. It was designed to be the "nerve center" for NORAD.

The NORAD center has been staffed by Canadian and United States military personnel to monitor North American air space for intercontinental ballistic missiles and incoming Soviet military aircraft. Locally, this military boom during the Cold War included the establishment of the United States Air Force Academy, Peterson Air Force Base, and Fort Carson. After the Cold War, NORAD monitored objects orbiting the earth and aircraft without flight plans. It is also known for monitoring the Christmas Eve orbit of Santa Claus.

NORAD used to offer public tours, but due to security concerns they were suspended in 1999. The off-ramp on NORAD road has been staffed by Air Force Security Police since September 11, 2001. Most of the center's operations were moved to Peterson Air Force Base in Colorado Springs in 2006, then in April 2015, the Pentagon reported that a few operations would be moving back in.

Antenna farm
During the 1950s, an antenna farm was built on the middle peak of the mountain when Bert Swisher deeded ten acres to Bud Edmonds and several backers and Swisher signed a non-compete agreement. Edmonds, John Browne, and Buck Ingersoll agreed to replace the trails to the area with a real road, which was opened in 1960 by the Cheyenne Propagation Company. There are 700 cell phone, television, radio, and law enforcement transmitters on the antenna farm. The Cheyenne Mountain radio site 145.160 repeater covers south central and southeast Colorado along the Interstate 25 corridor from Monument nearly to the New Mexico border. In 2002, it was operated by the Cheyenne Propagation Company.

Parks and recreation

Cheyenne Mountain State Park
The City of Colorado Springs and Colorado State Parks purchased 1,680 acres of land to preserve the "southeastern flank" of the mountain and its wildlife habitat in 2000. The land, originally the JL Ranch, was slated for development of 2,500 houses. The land was purchased to create the Cheyenne Mountain State Park, which is the only state park in El Paso County. An additional 1,021 acres at the top and east side of Cheyenne Mountain were acquired from 2007 to 2009. The park is now a total of 2,701 acres, part of which is at the base of the mountain and part of which is on Cheyenne Mountain. It has 20 miles of trails.

Cheyenne Cañon
The 1,600 acre North Cheyenne Cañon Park, Starsmore Discovery Center, Seven Falls, and some of Colorado Spring's "most exclusive neighborhoods" are located in Cheyenne Cañon.  The source of North Cheyenne Creek is in Teller County. South Cheyenne Creek's source, also in Teller County, is Mount Big Chief, near St. Peter's Dome. The flows through Seven Falls in South Cheyenne Cañon.

North Cheyenne Cañon Park was started when the city of Colorado Springs bought 640 acres in North Cheyenne Cañon from Colorado College in 1885. An additional 480 acres was donated by General William Jackson Palmer. That land included High Drive, Silver Cascade Falls, and Helen Hunt Falls.  In 1909 the Park Commission called it "by far the grandest and most popular of all the beautiful cañons near the city" for its evergreen trees, waterfalls, Cheyenne Creek, and rock formations. Moderate hikes in the canon include Mount Cutler and Columbine trails.

The two creeks meet and form Cheyenne Creek near the intersection of North Cheyenne Canyon Road, South Cheyenne Canyon Road, and Cheyenne Boulevard.

Historic trails
Two historic trails, only shown on the Pikes Peak Atlas, lead to the summit top of Cheyenne Mountain: the unofficial and faintly visible Swisher and the McNeil trails. At the top of the Swisher trail is a meadow and ruins of an old cabin.

In popular culture
 Cheyenne Mountain was featured at the beginning of 1992 miniseries Intruders
 Helen Hunt Jackson's poem, Cheyenne Mountain was published by 1893.
 In Robert Heinlein's 1966 The Moon Is a Harsh Mistress, a lunar colony's revolt against rule from Earth included the complete destruction of Cheyenne Mountain by rocks catapulted from the moon. 
 A fictionalized Cheyenne Mountain NORAD base was the setting for the 1983 movie WarGames.
 Cheyenne Mountain is the base of the fictional SGC (Stargate Command) and the location of the stargate in the military science fiction show Stargate SG-1.
 The Mountain was featured in the 2016 film, Independence Day: Resurgence.
 It is an early command center for the human resistance in L. Ron Hubbard's "Battlefield Earth: A Saga of the Year 3000" (1982).
 The Mountain is a possible choice for the location of XCOM HQ in XCOM Long War, which offers the benefit of already being partially developed.
 In the video game Horizon Zero Dawn, Cheyenne Mountain is known as All-Mother Mountain to the Nora Tribe and the modern-day Cheyenne Mountain Complex serves as the site of the Eleuthia-9 cradle facility
 The mountain serves as NASA's secret headquarters in the 2014 film Interstellar

See also

 Cheyenne Mountain Country Club, in the Broadmoor neighborhood
 Cheyenne Mountain School District 12, which includes Cheyenne Mountain Middle School and Cheyenne Mountain Elementary School
 Cheyenne Mountain Charter Academy
 Cheyenne Mountain High School
 List of Colorado mountain ranges
 List of Colorado mountain summits
 List of Colorado county high points

Notes

References

Further reading

External links

 Cheyenne Mountain Heritage Center

 
Mountains of Colorado
Mountains of El Paso County, Colorado
North American 2000 m summits
Pike National Forest